HK Ajkule Ilidža 2010 is an ice hockey team in Ilidža, Bosnia and Herzegovina. The team was founded in 2002, and plays in the Bosnia and Herzegovina Hockey League. Despite being from Ilidža, the club plays its games at Olympic Hall Zetra, in Sarajevo.

History
HK Ajkule Ilidža 2010 was founded in 2002 as HK Ilidža 2010 and joined the Bosnia and Herzegovina Hockey League to compete in its inaugural season. HK Ilidža 2010 finished second in the 2002–03 regular season standings and qualified for the best of three playoffs with first place finisher HK Bosna. Ilidža finished as runners-up after losing the first two games to HK Bosna. After the end of the 2002–03 season the league was disbanded for six years before returning in 2009. Ilidža however did not enter the 2009–10 season but rejoined the league for the 2010–11 season. Ilidža finished in last place managing only four wins in their 15 regular season games. During the 2010–11 season Ilidža also competed in the Jaroslav Jandourek Cup. Ilidža was drawn against HK Alfa for their first game. Ilidža won the game 6–3 and advanced to the final against HK Bosna who had defeated HK Stari Grad in their opening game. Ilidža won the Jaroslav Jandourek Cup after defeating HK Bosna in the final. For the start of the 2011–12 season the team was renamed to HK Ajkule Ilidža 2010.

Season-by-season record
Bosnia and Herzegovina Hockey League

Jaroslav Jandourek Cup
2011 Jaroslav Jandourek Cup — Won semi-final 3–6 vs. HK Alfa. Won final 2–1 vs. HK Bosna

References

Ice hockey teams in Bosnia and Herzegovina
Ice hockey clubs established in 2002
2002 establishments in Bosnia and Herzegovina